LTS may refer to:

Transport
 LTS Rail, later c2c, a British train operating company
 London, Tilbury and Southend line, a railway line in England
 Altus Air Force Base, Oklahoma, U.S., IATA code LTS
 Lelant Saltings railway station, Cornwall, England, station code LTS 
 Lufttransport Süd, a former German airline

Other uses
 Learning and Teaching Scotland, a body of the Scottish government
 Lexicon da teater svizzer, an encyclopedia of theater in Switzerland
 Leaning toothpick syndrome, a computer-programming idiom that describes a surfeit of backslashes
 Liquid tradable securities, a type of financial instruments 
 Lithuanian Nationalist and Republican Union, a Lithuanian political party
 Long-term support, a product lifecycle management policy 
 Low-threshold spikes, membrane depolarizations in cell biology

See also